Jumped Right In is the first studio album by Canadian country music artist Dallas Smith. It was released on May 22, 2012 via 604 Records under the production of Joey Moi. Its first single, "Somebody Somewhere," peaked at number 79 on the Canadian Hot 100.

"If It Gets You Where You Wanna Go" was previously recorded by Steve Holy on his 2011 album Love Don't Run.

Jumped Right In was nominated for Country Album of the Year at the 2013 Juno Awards.

Track listing

Chart performance

Album

Singles

Certifications

References

2012 debut albums
Dallas Smith albums
604 Records albums
Albums produced by Joey Moi